Sheikh Omar Sheikh Muhammad Farah (1975 – 26 May 2012) was the chairman of Ahlu Sunna Waljama'a from 22 February 2009 to 18 April 2010.

From 18 April 2010 he has been defense secretary as well as the operation commander in Benadir region for Ahlu Sunna Waljama'a.

Later (since October 2010) he has been lobbying for Somali youth not to join any militias and not to be misguided.

Death
On 26 May 2012 Sheikh Omar was injured in a road accident between Dagari and Galkayo in the Mudug region of Somalia. He was taken to a hospital in Galkayo where he died the same day. He was buried on 27 May in Salgadud graveyard in Galkayo.

References

Ethnic Somali people
Sufi teachers
1975 births
2012 deaths